Jorge David Arroyo Váldez (born 23 September 1991 in Guayaquil, Ecuador) is an Ecuadorian weightlifter. He competed at the 2012 Summer Olympics in the -105 kg event, finishing in 6th place.

References

IWF profile

1991 births
Living people
Sportspeople from Guayaquil
Ecuadorian male weightlifters
Olympic weightlifters of Ecuador
Weightlifters at the 2012 Summer Olympics
Weightlifters at the 2015 Pan American Games
Pan American Games gold medalists for Ecuador
Pan American Games bronze medalists for Ecuador
Pan American Games medalists in weightlifting
South American Games gold medalists for Ecuador
South American Games medalists in weightlifting
Competitors at the 2010 South American Games
Weightlifters at the 2011 Pan American Games
Weightlifters at the 2019 Pan American Games
Medalists at the 2011 Pan American Games
Medalists at the 2015 Pan American Games
Medalists at the 2019 Pan American Games
21st-century Ecuadorian people